Neoascia balearensis is a species of hoverfly in the family Syrphidae.

Distribution
Mallorca.

References

Eristalinae
Insects described in 2002
Diptera of Europe